The 1948–49 Hong Kong First Division League season was the 38th since its establishment.

League table

References
1948–49 Hong Kong First Division table (RSSSF)

Hong Kong First Division League seasons
Hong
football